Bawean Airport , also known as Harun Thohir Airport, is an airport serving Bawean, an island in East Java Province, Indonesia. The airport began operations in January 2016, and was officially opened by minister of transportation Ignasius Jonan on 30 January 2016.

Facility 
 Terminal building

Airlines and destinations 

The following airlines offer scheduled passenger service:

References 

Airports in East Java
Airports established in 2016